Ophyiulus is a genus of millipedes in the family Julidae. There are more than 30 described species in Ophyiulus.

Species
These 32 species belong to the genus Ophyiulus:

 Ophyiulus barbatus Verhoeff, 1908
 Ophyiulus bastiensis (Verhoeff, 1943)
 Ophyiulus castanearum Verhoeff, 1930
 Ophyiulus cerii Verhoeff, 1942
 Ophyiulus chilopogon (Latzel, 1884)
 Ophyiulus collaris (Verhoeff, 1930)
 Ophyiulus corsicus (Verhoeff, 1943)
 Ophyiulus curvipes (Verhoeff, 1898)
 Ophyiulus germanicus (Verhoeff, 1896)
 Ophyiulus glandulosus Verhoeff, 1910
 Ophyiulus italianus Attems, 1926
 Ophyiulus jeekeli Strasser, 1974
 Ophyiulus lostiae Silvestri, 1898
 Ophyiulus macchiae Verhoeff, 1930
 Ophyiulus major Bigler & Verhoeff, 1920
 Ophyiulus minimus Strasser, 1959
 Ophyiulus muelleri Strasser, 1937
 Ophyiulus napolitanus (Attems, 1903)
 Ophyiulus nigrofuscus (Verhoeff, 1894)
 Ophyiulus osellai Strasser, 1970
 Ophyiulus parellenicus Silvestri, 1896
 Ophyiulus pilosus (Newport, 1843)
 Ophyiulus renosensis Mauriès, 1969
 Ophyiulus rubrodorsalis (Verhoeff, 1901)
 Ophyiulus sardus Attems, 1926
 Ophyiulus solitarius Bigler, 1946
 Ophyiulus spezianus Verhoeff, 1936
 Ophyiulus strandi (Attems, 1927)
 Ophyiulus targionii Silvestri, 1898
 Ophyiulus terrestris (Berlese, 1884)
 Ophyiulus velebiticus Attems, 1927
 Ophyiulus verruculiger (Verhoeff, 1910)

References

Further reading

External links

 

Julida
Articles created by Qbugbot